If Trees Could Fly is a studio album by the jazz acoustic bassist Marc Johnson and the electric cellist Eric Longsworth. The record was released via the Intuition Music label in 1998. It contains eleven compositions arranged and performed only on bass viol and cello.

Reception

Chris Massey of PopMatters stated: "There are only two instruments present on If Trees Could Fly: bass and electric cello. This is all: Mr. Johnson on the bass, Mr. Longsworth on the electric cello. The beauty of the music upon this album is the interaction between these two unadorned sounds. The bass typically paints a rolling background, when not off on a rhythmic tangent, and Mr. Johnson is always on top of his craft. So is Mr. Longsworth. The cello is sometimes staccato, sometimes swelling, always precise. The music, of course, is more than the unadorned voices of two men and their instruments. The instrumental record finds a third voice in the mixture and interaction of both the bass and the cello... This album is aptly named—if trees could fly, it would hardly match the musical accomplishment of these two musicians".

Track listing

Personnel
Band
Marc Johnson – bass
Eric Longsworth – electric cello

Production
Pierre Arpin – photography
Bruce Rosen – cover painting

References

External links 
Eric Longsworth's official website

1998 albums
Marc Johnson (musician) albums